The Croatian War of Independence (1991–1995) is said to have attracted "mercenaries, adventurers and idealists", most joining the Croatian side.

Croatian side
Croats from Bosnia and Herzegovina, and also the diaspora, joined the Croatian side. The war attracted 'mercenaries, adventurers and idealists', most of whom joined the Croatian Defence Forces (HOS), the paramilitary wing of the Croatian Party of Rights, at the beginning of the war. An interview with mercenaries was published in The Times in November 1991. Many extreme right volunteers from Western Europe, mainly from Germany, joined the HOS. Although Russians mainly volunteered on the Serb side, the small neo-Nazi "Werewolf" unit fought on the Croat side. The Croatian Army's "First International Brigade" based outside Osijek that consisted of 100 men had about half of the ranks being foreigners from France, Canada, Switzerland, Hungary, Portugal, Britain, Australia, the United States and Spain.

Yugoslav Albanians joined the Croatian Army in the war. There is a veterans organization of these. It is estimated by that veterans organization that 10,000 ethnic Albanians fought in the Croatian Army, out of whom 87 died. The Community of Associations of Volunteers registered 2,579 Albanians fighting in the Croatian Army in 1991. Albanian President Bujar Nishani gave the Albanian veterans organization an order. Among notable Kosovo Albanians that fought in the Croatian Army were Rahim Ademi (ranked brigadier-general), Agim Çeku (ranked general), and Bekim Berisha.

Serb side
There were around 700 former JNA officers, mostly from Serbia and Montenegro, that fought on the Serb side.

A small number of Russian volunteers, from Russia and other states of the former USSR, fought for the armed forces of the Republic of Serbian Krajina, as well as for Serbian paramilitary groups, such as the Serbian Volunteer Guard, led by Arkan. The majority of these Russian volunteers arrived in 1992 and 1993.

Notable people
Bekim Berisha, Kosovo Albanian, HV
Rahim Ademi, Kosovo Albanian, HV
Agim Çeku, Kosovo Albanian, HV
Ridvan Qazimi, Kosovo Albanian, HV
Thomas Crowley, Irish, HOS 
Jean-Michel Nicolier, French, HOS 
Eduardo Rózsa-Flores, Hungarian, HV

See also
Foreign fighters in the Bosnian War

References

Sources

Croatian War of Independence
Mercenary warfare